James Walter McFarlane (12 December 1920, Sunderland – 9 August 1999, Stody, Norfolk) was a scholar of European literature, author of The Oxford Ibsen, and founding Dean of the School of European Studies at University of East Anglia which included Scandinavian studies.

Early years 
McFarlane grew up in Sunderland and attended Bede Grammar School, and then went to St Catherine's College, Oxford.  His Oxford degree in modern languages, interrupted by war while he served in Europe in the Intelligence Corps, was completed in 1947.  During the war he played association football for Sunderland A.F.C.

His first appointment was as lecturer at Durham University in 1947, in the department of German and Scandinavian studies at King's College. (In 1963, this became Newcastle University) Here he encountered the likes of Harald Naess and Ake Leander.

Oxford Ibsen 
Between 1960 and 1977 he edited the eight volumes of The Oxford Ibsen (OI), consisting of translations of Henrik Ibsen's works, many of which were his own.  Graham Orton is credited as an editor and translator.  Other contributors included Johan Fillinger, Christopher Fry and James Kirkup.

Volumes
 1970: Early plays
 1962: The Vikings at Helgeland, Love's Comedy, The Pretenders
 1972: Brand; Peer Gynt
 1963: The League of Youth, Emperor and Galilean
 1961: Pillars of society; A Doll's House; Ghosts
 1960: An Enemy of the People; The Wild Duck; Rosmersholm
 1966: Lady From the Sea; Hedda Gabler, the Master Builder
 1977: Little Eyolf; John Gabriel Borkman; When We Dead Awaken

As a result of this work, McFarlane was also appointed a Knight Commander of the Royal Norwegian Order of Saint Olav, and made a member of Danish and Norwegian academies.

University of East Anglia 
McFarlane moved to Norwich, and in 1964 he was appointed Chair of European Literature at the newly established University of East Anglia, and founding dean of the school of European studies.

Between 1968 and 1971 he was the Pro-Vice-Chancellor.  In 1974 he became the editor of the journal Scandinavica.

In 1982 he retired, however he remained active as a Professorial Fellow until 1986.

In his retirement he established and built his Norvik Press to publish translations and commentary of Scandinavian literature, with a bias in publishing translations and other works by its own editorial team.

In 1991 he retired from editor of Scandinavica.

Community life 
He married Kathleen Crouch in 1944.  They were both active in the community, with James acting as:
 member of council for the Eastern Arts Association
 Chairman of the BBC Regional Advisory Board
 Chairman of the Wells Arts Centre
 Chairman of the Hunsworth Crafts Trust
 a director of the Norwich Puppet Theatre

Kathleen had a distinguished career in weaving, and died in 2008, survived by their daughter and two sons.

Bibliography

References

External links 
 Oxford-Ibsen, Open Library
 Nordic Press

1920 births
1999 deaths
People educated at Bede Grammar School for Boys
Alumni of St Catherine's College, Oxford
Academics of the University of East Anglia
People from Sunderland
English translators
20th-century British translators
English male non-fiction writers
20th-century English male writers